During the 1992–93 English football season, Coventry City competed in the inaugural season of the FA Premier League.

Season summary
After narrowly avoiding relegation the previous season, Coventry's form improved this season and the club finished in a stable 15th position. The club began the season with a run of six wins from their opening eight games to sit in second place, but a run of 11 games without a win, albeit a run with only three defeats, dragged the club down to ninth. The club's form for the next quarter of the season saw the club rise to fifth with a genuine possibility of challenging for European qualification. However, after the sale of striker Robert Rosario (a key provider for the firepower of the likes of Micky Quinn and Peter Ndlovu) to strugglers Nottingham Forest, another run of 11 games with only one win dragged Coventry to 15th, the lowest place they had occupied all season - finishing only three points above the relegation zone. Survival was only secured on the final day of the season with a thrilling 3–3 draw with Leeds United.

Kit
Coventry City's kit was manufactured by Ribero and sponsored by French car maker Peugeot.

Final league table

Results
Coventry City's score comes first

Legend

FA Premier League

FA Cup

League Cup

Squad

Left club during season

Transfers

In
 Micky Quinn - Newcastle United, 20 November, £250,000

Out
 Kevin Gallacher - Blackburn Rovers, £1,500,000

References

Coventry City F.C. seasons
Coventry City